Christian Dimarco (born 23 July 2002) is an Italian professional footballer who plays as a defender for  club Fiorenzuola on loan from Feralpisalò.

Club career

Inter Milan
Dimarco started his career in Inter Milan youth sector.

Loan to Fiorenzuola
On 31 July 2021, Dimarco was loaned to Serie C club Fiorenzuola.

Feralpisalò
On 8 July 2022, Dimarco joined Feralpisalò on a permanent deal. On 31 January 2023, he returned to Fiorenzuola on loan.

Personal life
He is the brother of Inter Milan and Italy national football team player Federico Dimarco.

Career statistics

Club

References

External links

2002 births
Living people
Footballers from Milan
Italian footballers
Italy youth international footballers
Association football defenders
Serie C players
Inter Milan players
U.S. Fiorenzuola 1922 S.S. players
FeralpiSalò players